Joel Julius Ilmari Pohjanpalo (born 13 September 1994) is a Finnish professional footballer who plays as a forward for Italian  club Venezia. He also represents the Finland national football team. Pohjanpalo was born in Helsinki, Finland where he began his career with HJK. He made his Veikkausliiga debut on 26 October 2011 at the age of 17 and moved out to Germany at age 19 in 2013.

Pohjanpalo made his international debut for Finland in November 2012, at the age of eighteen and has since made over fifty appearances, including playing in matches for 2018 and 2022 FIFA World Cup qualification.

Club career

HJK
A product of his hometown club HJK, Pohjanpalo emerged through the youth ranks, first appearing with the reserve team (Klubi-04) in 2011 at the age of 16. He made his Veikkausliiga debut on 26 October 2011, starting against RoPS. During his first season in the Finnish 2nd division with Klubi-04, he made 21 appearances, scored a record-breaking 33 league goals and was awarded as the series player of the season. Following his excellent performances with the reserves, Pohjanpalo signed a new contract with HJK on 7 December 2011, keeping him in the Finnish capital until 2015.

Pohjanpalo started HJK's first league match of the 2012 Veikkausliiga season on 15 April 2012, scoring a hat-trick within the space of three minutes (162 seconds) against IFK Mariehamn. After a three-day trial with Liverpool in August 2012, Pohjanpalo was offered a three-year contract but rejected the deal due to a lack of guaranteed playing time for Liverpool F.C. Reserves. He finished the 2012 season at HJK with 19 goals in 42 games in all competitions. He was awarded as the Veikkausliiga rookie of the season.

Bayer Leverkusen and loans
On 1 September 2013, Pohjanpalo was loaned to German Bundesliga team Bayer Leverkusen, who then loaned him to 2. Bundesliga team VfR Aalen. At Aalen, Pohjanpalo started thirteen matches and appeared as a substitute in a further nine, scoring five goals.

In April 2014, Pohjanpalo renewed his contract with HJK, extending it to 2018. At the same time HJK extended his loan contract with Bayer Leverkusen a further two years, which Pohjanpalo spent on loan at Fortuna Düsseldorf. He was voted the 2. Bundesliga Player of the Month in October 2014, following a hat-trick against Darmstadt 98.

On 21 March 2016, Leverkusen announced that they had exercised their option to permanently sign Pohjanpalo. On 27 August 2016, Pohjanpalo finally made his debut for the club in their opening game of the 2016–17 Bundesliga season against Borussia Mönchengladbach. He scored just a minute after being substituted on, but it was not enough to prevent Leverkusen from losing 2–1. Pohjanpalo came off the bench in Leverkusen's second game of the season and scored a hat-trick, helping his side achieve a 3–1 win over Hamburger SV. After these two appearances, Pohjanpalo had scored four goals in just thirty minutes of play during the first two matches of the season.

On 24 January 2020, Pohjanpalo joined Hamburger SV on loan for the rest of the 2019–20 season. On 30 September 2020, Pohjanpalo joined Union Berlin on loan for the 2020–21 season.

Venezia
On 19 August 2022, Pohjanpalo signed a three-year contract with Venezia in Italy, with an option to extend for two more years.

International career

Youth
Pohjanpalo made his debut for the Finland U21 side at the age of 17 on 5 June 2012 against Slovenia.

Senior
Pohjanpalo made his senior national team debut on 14 November 2012 in a 3−0 victory against Cyprus when he replaced Teemu Pukki as a substitute on the 70th minute. He was close to scoring in a friendly against Slovenia when his shot hit the post and was then finished by Hämäläinen. In the next friendly game against Hungary he finished his first international goal entering the field as a substitute and equalising the game. He made his UEFA European Championship qualification match debut on 7 September 2014 in a match against Faroe Islands when he entered as an 89th-minute substitute for Teemu Pukki. He scored his first goal in a competitive match on 4 September 2015 in a UEFA Euro 2016 qualifying match in Karaiskakis Stadium, Piraeus against Greece.

On 12 June 2021, he scored the only goal in a 1–0 win over Denmark in the UEFA Euro 2020, to grant his country their first goal and win in a major competition.

Career statistics

Club

International
.

Scores and results list Finland's goal tally first, score column indicates score after each Pohjanpalo goal.

Honours
Klubi-04
Finnish League Division 2, Group A: 2011

HJK
Veikkausliiga: 2012, 2013

Individual
Finnish League Division 2 Top scorer: 2011
Finnish League Division 2 Group A Player of the Season: 2011
Veikkausliiga Rookie of the Season: 2012

References

External links

 Profile at hjk.fi  
 Bayer 04 Leverkusen official profile 
 Joel Pohjanpalo  – SPL competition record
 
 
 
 
 
 
 

1994 births
Living people
Footballers from Helsinki
Association football forwards
Finnish footballers
Finland youth international footballers
Finland under-21 international footballers
Finland international footballers
PK-35 Vantaa (men) players
Helsingin Jalkapalloklubi players
Klubi 04 players
Bayer 04 Leverkusen players
VfR Aalen players
Fortuna Düsseldorf players
Hamburger SV players
1. FC Union Berlin players
Çaykur Rizespor footballers
Venezia F.C. players
Veikkausliiga players
Ykkönen players
Kakkonen players
Bundesliga players
2. Bundesliga players
Regionalliga players
Süper Lig players
Serie B players
UEFA Euro 2020 players
Finnish expatriate footballers
Finnish expatriate sportspeople in Germany
Expatriate footballers in Germany
Finnish expatriate sportspeople in Turkey
Expatriate footballers in Turkey
Finnish expatriate sportspeople in Italy
Expatriate footballers in Italy